Equis may refer to:

EFMD Quality Improvement System (or EQUIS), an international system of assessment and accreditation of higher education institutions in management and business administration run by the European Foundation for Management Development
Equis International (or Equis) a Thomson Reuters software company which produces technical analysis software used in stock markets
Equis, album by Uruguayan rock band Snake
X, known as equis in the Spanish alphabet